Naenia is a genus of moths of the family Noctuidae erected by Stephens in 1827.

Species
 Naenia contaminata (Walker, 1865)
 Naenia typica (Linnaeus, 1758) – the Gothic

References

 
Noctuinae